L 98-59 (TOI-175, TIC 307210830) is a bright M dwarf star, located in the constellation of Volans, at a distance of , as measured by Gaia.

Broadband photometry shows that it is an M3 dwarf star with four confirmed terrestrial-sized planets in transit, which were announced in March 2019 by TESS.

In August 2021, new evidence was announced for a fifth, potentially habitable planet, labeled L 98-59 f. Though still unconfirmed, this planet is believed to have 2.46 times Earth's mass, and an orbital period of 23.15 days.

Planetary system
The two innermost planets, b and c, as well as L 98-59 e are possibly hot rocky worlds. L 98-59 c has an uncertain indications of atmosphere as in 2023. L 98-59 d has large amounts of water, potentially as much as 30% of its entire mass, it may therefore have an ocean covering much of its surface. The three inner planets were discovered in 2019.
The super-Venus planet L 98-59 e was discovered in 2021, along with potentially habitable (located in the middle of the habitable zone) super-Earth candidate L 98-59 f. In September 2021, suggested tests of the abilities of the Hubble Space Telescope and the upcoming James Webb Space Telescope to detect and describe the atmospheric features of the three inner planets were reported.

Gallery

References

External links 
 New ESO observations show rocky exoplanet has just half the mass of Venus (ESO press release)
 TESS – Official Website
 Smallest exoplanet found so far (video; 1:53; NASA; June 2019)

 

M-type main-sequence stars
Planetary systems with four confirmed planets
175
J08180763-6818468
Volans (constellation)